Gephyraspis is a genus of moths belonging to the family Tortricidae.

Species
Gephyraspis contranota Diakonoff, 1973
Gephyraspis insolita Diakonoff, 1973
Gephyraspis lutescens Diakonoff, 1960

See also
List of Tortricidae genera

References

External links
tortricidae.com

Archipini
Tortricidae genera